Pogromok is a rural locality (a settlement) in Yudanovskoye Rural Settlement, Bobrovsky District, Voronezh Oblast, Russia. The population was 73 as of 2010.

Geography 
Pogromok is located 31 km northwest of Bobrov (the district's administrative centre) by road. Yudanovka is the nearest rural locality.

References 

Rural localities in Bobrovsky District